The Franco-Italian Agreements (often called Mussolini-Laval Accord) were signed in Rome by both French Foreign Minister Pierre Laval and Italian Prime Minister Benito Mussolini on 7 January 1935.

History
After its victory in World War I, it was agreed that Italy would not receive territories from the defeated German colonial empire. It was divided between France, Japan and the British Empire, but Italy would be rewarded some bordering areas from the British and French colonial possessions. That was considered by Italians to be very little compensation for their sacrifices in the bloody war, which was one of the reasons of the rise to power in Italy of Mussolini's fascism.

The British ceded Oltregiuba (today Jubaland) from Kenya to Italian Somalia in 1924, but the French delayed some years until 1935, under Laval's leadership, and gave only a small amount of territory in eastern Africa and a desert area in the French Sahara.

Laval had succeeded Louis Barthou as Foreign Minister after the latter's assassination in Marseilles on 9 October 1934, along with King Alexander I of Yugoslavia. Laval borrowed the idea of his predecessor of a system of collective security to contain the threat of Hitler in Europe. On 4 January 1935 Laval went to Rome, the capital of Italy, to meet Mussolini. It was the beginning of a diplomatic offensive intended to contain Nazi Germany by a network of alliances.

He proposed a treaty to Mussolini to define disputed parts of French Somaliland (now Djibouti) as part of Eritrea, redefine the official status of Italians in French Tunisia and give Italy a mainly-free hand to occupy Ethiopia during the Abyssinia Crisis.

Italy was also to receive the Aouzou Strip, which was to be moved from French-ruled Chad to Italian-ruled Libya (that issue would have some implications in World War II and in the later Toyota War between Libya and Chad).

In exchange for those concessions, France hoped for Italian support against German aggression, which did not occur.

The agreements were confirmed by a law of the French Parliament on 26 March 1935. The French and the Italian Parliaments ratified the 1935 agreement. Since the instruments of ratification were not exchanged, ICJ named the agreement as "Non-ratified".

The agreement had the following main terms:
 A small territory in French Somaliland south of Eritrean Rahayta was to be given to Italian Eritrea.
 The village of Aozou and the surrounding Aozou strip in French Africa Chad was to be given to Italian Libya.
 Italy was given a free hand by the French government to occupy Ethiopia.

References

Sources 
 G. Bruce Strang: Imperial Dreams: The Mussolini-Laval Accords of January 1935. In: The Historical Journal 44, September 2001, 3, pp. 799–809.
R. Festorazzi Laval Mussolini. L'impossibile Asse, Milano: Mursia, 
Langer, William L. ed., An Encyclopaedia of World History, (1948), Houghton Mifflin Company, Boston.  Pg. 990.

See also
Stresa Front

Modern history of Italy
1935 in Italy
1935 in France
Interwar-period treaties
Treaties concluded in 1935
Treaties of the French Third Republic
Treaties of the Kingdom of Italy (1861–1946)
France–Italy relations
Treaties involving territorial changes
Pierre Laval
Benito Mussolini